Pijush Kanti Bhattacharjee (born 1 March 1940) is a Bangladeshi academic and politician from Jessore belonging to Bangladesh Awami League. He is a former member of the Jatiya Sangsad. He is a presidium member of the central committee of Bangladesh Awami League. His brother Swapan Bhattacharjee the state minister of the Ministry of Local Government, Rural Development and Co-operatives.

Biography
Bhattacharjee was born on 1 March 1940 at Parala in Manirampur of Jessore to Sudhir Bhattacharjee and Usha Rani Bhattacharjee. He completed matriculation from Khajura M. N. Mitra Multilateral High School and completed higher secondary studies from Michael Modhushudon College. He graduated from University of Rajshahi in 1961 and completed postgraduate studies from there in 1968. He was an organizer of the Liberation War of Bangladesh.

Bhattacharjee was a teacher of Mashihati High School and Gopalpur High School. He was a teacher of Keshabpur Degree College too. He was also the vice principal of Manirampur Degree College.

Bhattacharjee was elected as a member of the Jatiya Sangsad from Jessore-7 in 1973.

References

Living people
1940 births
1st Jatiya Sangsad members
People from Jessore District
Awami League politicians
Bangladeshi Hindus
Bangladeshi educators
University of Rajshahi alumni
People of the Bangladesh Liberation War